Roy Herman Kellerman (March 14, 1915 – March 22, 1984) was a U.S. Secret Service senior agent who was assigned to protect United States President John F. Kennedy when he was assassinated on November 22, 1963 in Dallas. In his reports, later testimony and interviews, Kellerman outlines in detail his role in the immediate aftermath of the assassination, controlling key evidence of the crime and guiding doctors during the official autopsy at Bethesda Naval Hospital.

History
Kellerman, a New Baltimore, Michigan native, graduated from high school in 1933 and worked for the Dodge division of Chrysler sporadically from 1935 until 1937 when he was sworn in as a trooper for the Michigan State Police. Kellerman joined the Secret Service in Detroit just before Christmas 1941, transferring temporarily to the White House detail in March 1942 and permanently one month later. In 1965, Kellerman was promoted to "deputy special agent in charge", replacing Floyd Boring.  He retired from the Secret Service in 1968 as an assistant administrator.

Kellerman died in St. Petersburg, Florida, on March 22, 1984, eight days after his 69th birthday.

Actions during assassination
As the Assistant Special Agent in Charge of November 22, 1963, Shift Team #3, Kellerman was riding in the front passenger seat of the presidential limousine. The driver was Secret Service Agent William Greer. Like all Secret Service agents assigned to protect the President of the United States, Kellerman was trained to use his own body as a shield, taking a bullet if necessary in the line of duty.

Kellerman along with Secret Service agents William Greer, Clint Hill, and Rufus Youngblood, provided testimony to the Warren Commission in Washington, D.C. on March 9, 1964.

Kellerman testified, "I turned around to find out what happened when two additional shots rang out and the President slumped into Mrs. Kennedy's lap and Governor Connally fell to Mrs. Connally's lap."

He further testified to the Warren Commission that the assassination then ended in a "flurry of shells" coming into the limousine.

The House Select Committee on Assassinations declared in 1979 that "the Secret Service was deficient in the performance of its duties" at the time of the assassination, and that President Kennedy did not receive adequate protection in Dallas. Regarding the conduct of Secret Service Agent Roy Kellerman, the HSCA noted:

No actions were taken by the agent in the right front seat of the Presidential limousine [Roy Kellerman] to cover the President with his body, although it would have been consistent with Secret Service procedure for him to have done so. The primary function of the agent was to remain at all times in close proximity to the President in the event of such emergencies.

Controller of evidence
Kellerman's report and later testimony indicate that he was with the president without interruption from the motorcade's departure from Love Field, through the entire autopsy and embalming and up until the president's remains were brought back to the White House. In photographs and footage of the casket being loaded aboard Air Force One at Love Field, and later upon its arrival at Andrews Air Force Base, Kellerman can be seen directing the movements of the president's casket.

Kellerman maintained his composure immediately after Kennedy's assassination, managing events as they continued to develop. Kellerman testified that he played a role in the autopsy at Bethesda, including guiding the doctors toward specific conclusions regarding bullet locations. Kellerman also took personal custody of the X-rays and photographic negatives at the conclusion of the autopsy and took them with him as he rode in the ambulance that transported the President's casket to the White House. When asked by the House Select Committee on Assassinations staff why he wanted this material, he said "...the point is, he was our man, everything belonged in the White House."

With Kellerman in charge of local events, and with the assistance of Greer, the Secret Service maintained custody of the most important evidence of the crime, including the president's body, clothing, limousine, forensic tissues, and autopsy photographs and X-rays, returning everything to the White House before the sun rose on November 23, 1963.

According to an interview given in 1981 after John Hinckley, Jr.'s attempt to assassinate President Reagan in 1981, Kellerman did not believe there was a conspiracy to assassinate Kennedy. However, in 1994, Vanity Fair published an article by Anthony Summers and Robbyn Swan in which they quoted Kellerman's widow, June, as stating he "accepted that there was a conspiracy."

In popular culture
In the 2013 film Parkland, actor Tom Welling played the role of Kellerman.

References

 Philip H. Mellanson, with Peter F. Stevens, The Secret Service: The Hidden History of an Enigmatic Agency, (Carroll & Graf, 2002), p. 77.
 Obit, The Washington Post, March 30, 1984

External links

 

1915 births
1984 deaths
Witnesses to the assassination of John F. Kennedy
United States Secret Service agents
People from New Baltimore, Michigan